Events from the year 1160 in Ireland.

Incumbents
 High King: Muirchertach Mac Lochlainn

Events
Jerpoint Abbey is founded in County Kilkenny.
Earliest recorded reference to Dromcollogher - in the Book of Leinster.

Deaths
17 December – Gilla na Naemh Ua Duinn, poet, historian and cleric (born 1102).

References